Hawkins's rail (Diaphorapteryx hawkinsi), also called the giant Chatham Island rail or mehonui, is an extinct species of flightless rail. It was endemic to the Chatham Islands east of New Zealand. It is known to have existed only on the main islands of Chatham Island and Pitt Island. It had a long, downward curving beak. Historic accounts likely referring to the bird by the name "mehonui" suggest that it was red-brown in colour, and it has been compared to the weka in ecological habits, using its beak to probe decaying wood for invertebrates. Hawkins's rail likely became extinct due to overhunting by the islands native inhabitants, the Moriori, and the bird is known from skeletal remains found in their kitchen middens.

Taxonomy 
In 1892, Henry Ogg Forbes received several unusual fossil bones originating from the Chatham Islands sent by William Hawkins, amongst these was a distinctive skull, which Forbes realised represented a now extinct species of rail.  He named the species Aphanapteryx hawkinsi in honour of Hawkins, placing the bird in the same genus as the extinct red rail from the Mascarene island of Mauritius in the Indian Ocean. Forbes proposed that a land bridge had once existed between Mauritius and the Chatham Islands, as part of his proposed lost continent of "Antipodea". Forbes personally went to the Chatham Islands later that year to do additional collecting. Later in 1892, on the advice of Edward Newton, Forbes placed Hawkins's rail into the separate genus Diaphorapteryx, though he later changed his mind and reverted to considering it to be a member of the genus Aphanapteryx. Between 1894 and 1895, Sigvard Jacob Dannefaerd collected several thousand bones of Hawkins's rail as part of a collection of “many hundreds of thousands” of bones collected from the Chatham Islands on behalf of the financier and zoologist Walter Rothschild. In 1896, the idea of a close relationship between the red rail and Hawkins's rail and the biogeographic connection between Mauritius and the Chatham Islands was criticised by Charles William Andrews due to there being no other overlapping species between the islands fauna, and Hans Friedrich Gadow considered the similar morphology of the two birds to be explained by parallel evolution.

Evolution 
A 2014 genetic study found that the closest relative of Hawkins's rail was the invisible rail (Habroptila wallacii), endemic to the island of Halmahera in the Maluku Islands, Indonesia, with their last shared common ancestor existing around 10 million years ago. The two rails were then in turn found to be most closely related to the genus Gallirallus.

Description

Skeleton 
The wings of the bird are greatly reduced. The legs are robust with elongate toes. The beak is elongate and curves downwards (decurved).

Historical accounts 
No contemporary European accounts of the bird exist, and it was long thought that Hawkins's rail became extinct hundreds of years prior to European discovery of the Chatham Islands in the early 19th century, with Millener 1999 suggesting that the extinction of Hawkins's rail took place between approximately 1550 and 1700 AD. However, historic accounts based on recollections by Moriori of a bird referred to as the Mehonui suggest that Hawkins's rail may have become extinct much later. An 1895 letter from Sigvard Dannefaerd belonging to Walter Rothschild describes the appearance, behaviour, and Moriori hunting method concerning the species:

A second account was published by Alexander Shand in 1911, in his writings on Moriori cuisine:

Shand's account mistakenly refers to Hawkins's rail as a type of parrot, but the remaining details are consistent with Dannefaerd's account. The source of the accounts was likely the Moriori elder Hirawanu Tapu (1824-1900), a noted source on Moriori tradition. The accounts suggest that the bird was dull brick-red in colour, that it spent much of its time pecking for invertebrates in decaying wood, similar behaviour is known from weka. The loud "Tue-ck" cry may have been the contact call. The "colonies" referred to in the accounts likely refer to family groups of five to eight individuals formed during the breeding season, as occurs in related rail species. Due to the strength of its beak it has been suggested to have been capable of consuming a wide variety of prey, including on ground dwelling chicks, such as those of petrels.

Extinction 
The presence of detailed accounts from the late 19th century suggest that the extinction of Hawkins's rail was more recent than previously supposed, and that the birds survived long after the arrival of the Moriori. It has long been known that the Moriori hunted the bird, due to their remains being found in midden deposits. Neither of the two accounts states the abundance of the birds or how often hunting of them occurred, but in their analysis of the accounts Joanne Cooper and Alan Tennyson suggest that the strategy of targeting what were likely the breeding groups of birds, containing both adults and juveniles, maximised impact on population. Cooper and Tennyson suggest that if the birds survived into the early European era, they may have finally become extinct due to the introduction of non-native mammals to the island, including cats, dogs, brown rats, and pigs, prior to the first survey of the islands fauna in 1840.

Photo Gallery

References

Rallidae
Extinct birds of the Chatham Islands
Bird extinctions since 1500
Extinct flightless birds
Birds described in 1892